Ciney Gurung is a singer, composer, and songwriter originally from Kurseong, Darjeeling and lives in Nepal now. She began her career with the hit songs "Timro Mayama" and "Mann". In 2009, Radio Kantipur named Gurung the best female pop singer of the year. Gurung married musician, Rojesh Shrestha, in 2005 and they have a daughter together. Gurung also participated in Melancholy, an environmental song by 365 Nepali artists which set a Guinness World Record for the "Most Vocal Solos in a Song Recording". It was written, composed and directed by environmentalist Nipesh DHAKA.

Albums
Yo Man

References

21st-century Nepalese women singers
Living people
1977 births
Gurung people